Pavel Drsek (born 22 September 1976) is a former Czech footballer who played as a defender. Having begun his professional career in 1993, he has played for several clubs in the Czech Republic, for MSV Duisburg and VfL Bochum in Germany, and for Panionios F.C. in Greece.

References

External links
 
 
 
 

1976 births
Living people
Sportspeople from Kladno
Association football defenders
Czech footballers
SK Kladno players
FK Hvězda Cheb players
FK Chmel Blšany players
FK Jablonec players
FK Bohemians Prague (Střížkov) players
MSV Duisburg players
VfL Bochum players
Expatriate footballers in Greece
Panionios F.C. players
Czech First League players
Bundesliga players
2. Bundesliga players
Czech football managers
FK Dukla Prague managers